In the early morning of January 7, 2023, in Washington, D.C., the United States, Jason Lewis shot and killed 13-year-old Karon Blake.

Lewis, a 41-year-old father of four and longtime government employee, had stepped onto his patio to investigate a possible home invasion when he saw Blake and two others breaking into parked vehicles along his street. In the seconds following a brief confrontation with the group, Lewis opened fire, fatally wounding Blake.

After several weeks of investigation, Lewis was arrested and charged with murder in second degree while armed. He has entered a plea of not guilty and is currently being held without bond.

Shooting

Official report 
The shooting took place in the early morning of Saturday, January 7, 2023, in the 1000 block of Quincy Street, Northeast, an area apart of the Brookland neighborhood. The Metropolitan Police Department (MPDC) arrived on the scene at approximately 3:56 am. When police officers arrived, they found an older black male performing cardiopulmonary resuscitation (CPR) on a juvenile black male, lying in the shrubbery between 1031 and 1033 Quincy Street, Northeast, suffering from gunshot wounds. The older male would later be identified as a nearby homeowner, 41-year-old Jason Lewis of 1033 Quincy Street, Northeast, a government employee, as the younger as 13-year-old Karon Blake, a student at Brookland Middle School. Emergency medical services (EMS) transported Blake to a nearby hospital, where he was later pronounced dead at 4:39 am.

Lewis' account 
Lewis told authorities that he'd woken in the night to noises outside his home and worried that someone might be trying to break into his home. He went downstairs to investigate the noise, taking his firearm, which he legally owned and was legally authorized to carry, with him. He opened his door to see several people dressed in black, whom he described as "youngsters," and yelled at them, asking them what they were doing after seeing them tampering with nearby vehicles. One person, whom he identified as Blake, ran towards him as he stood in the courtyard of his home and he opened fire, shooting twice. Lewis' girlfriend called 9-1-1 while Lewis began administering CPR after Blake collapsed.

Video footage and additional information 
A nearby camera captured much of the incident on video. Blake, along with two other juvenile males, arrived on the scene in a stolen Kia, which police referred to as a getaway vehicle, and began tampering with parked vehicles in the area. Lewis, armed, stepped onto his front patio and fired a shot at the parked car, which contained the other two juvenile males. Police said that when initially questioned, Lewis never mentioned firing at the car. After the Lewis' initial shot, Karon, the only male not in the car, began running in the direction of Lewis' home, though police said he never stepped onto Lewis' property. Lewis fired three shots. Blake can be heard saying "I'm only 12," and apologizing to Lewis for his actions. Police chief Robert Contee expressed sympathy for the other two males involved, who were seen on video fleeing the scene, who remain unidentified.

Aftermath 
On Tuesday, January 10, 2023, Blake's mother, Londen Blake, created a fundraiser on the crowdfunding platform GoFundMe to help cover the cost of Blake's funeral and burial expenses. The fundraiser raised $35,879.

On Wednesday, January 11, 2023, D. C. Mayor Muriel Bowser, who is African American, told the press the party involved in the shooting was a government employee and that they'd been placed on administrative leave. Despite public outcry, Bowser declined to identify the party but did say that he was not a police officer when asked about his occupation. In response to demands from the public to identify the party, police chief Robert Contee, also African American, "We normally do not identify people in similar situations unless we have a warrant in hand for that person or unless there's a person who we are trying to identify... This is not what we're dealing with here." Contee warned the public that there was a lot of misinformation about the shooting going around the community.

On Saturday, January 14, 2023, a vigil was held in Blake's honor.

On Monday, January 23, 2023, a funeral service for Blake was held at Israel Baptist Church, located at 1251 Saratoga Avenue in Washington, D.C. News outlets reported hundreds of mourners, including local politicians and elected officials, were in attendance.

On Tuesday, January 31, 2023, U. S. Attorney Matthew M. Graves announced that a warrant had been issued for Jason Michael Lewis, a 41-year-old African American resident who'd been employed by the District of Columbia's Parks and Recreation Department for 18 years, in the death of Blake. Lewis had turned himself into the Metropolitan Police Department that day at 8:00 am and he appeared in court later that afternoon. Lewis was charged with second-degree murder, a Class A felony in the District of Columbia, and ordered to be held without bond while he awaits his trial. Blake's family members were present for Lewis' arraignment and Stephanie Ramirez of Fox 5 News (WTTG) reported they were "quietly celebrating in the court room" after the judge ruled Lewis would be held without bond. Lewis is scheduled to appear in court on Wednesday, February 15, 2023. He entered a plea of not guilty. The firearm involved in the shooting, described as Lewis' only firearm, was confiscated and authorities announced plans to revoke his CCW permit.

On Wednesday, February 1, 2023, Londen Blake addressed the press for the first time since Lewis' arrest, saying that she hopes Lewis is convicted.

Legal overview 
Lewis was charged with murder in the second degree while armed (§ 22–2103). Per the Code of the District of Columbia, individuals convicted of murder in the second degree may face life in prison and those convicted of murder in the second degree while armed receive a minimum sentence of 40 years in prison but only if certain circumstances apply to the situation. Murder in the second degree has the potential to be reduced to manslaughter, which carries a maximum sentence of 30 years in prison, in the absence of malice aforethought. While Lewis may argue he acted in self-defense, the District of Columbia does not have a stand-your-ground law and case law allows for a jury to consider an individual's failure to retreat when determining whether or not their use of force is justifiable.

See also

 Stand-your-ground law

References

2023 deaths
2023 in Washington, D.C.
2023 controversies in the United States
January 2023 events in the United States
Deaths by firearm in Washington, D.C.
Deaths by person in Washington, D.C.
Incidents of violence against boys
African-American history of Washington, D.C.